Poa supina is a species of flowering plant belonging to the family Poaceae.

Its native range is Morocco, Europe to Mongolia and Himalaya.

References

supina